Richard Krajicek defeated MaliVai Washington in the final, 6–3, 6–4, 6–3 to win the gentlemen's singles tennis title at the 1996 Wimbledon Championships. Krajicek was originally unseeded, but replaced seventh seed Thomas Muster in the draw when Muster withdrew from the tournament. Washington became the first male major finalist of African descent since Yannick Noah in the 1983 French Open, and the first at Wimbledon since Arthur Ashe in 1975.

Pete Sampras was the three-time defending champion, but was defeated by Krajicek in the quarterfinals. It would be his only loss at Wimbledon between 1993 and 2000.

For the first time since the 1990 French Open, none of the four semifinalists had previously won a major title. Of the four, only Todd Martin had contested a major final before.

An unusual number of top seeds were eliminated early, including 1992 champion Andre Agassi (No. 3), reigning French Open champion Yevgeny Kafelnikov (No. 5), Michael Chang (No. 6), and 1993 finalist Jim Courier (No. 9): all in the first round. Three-time champion Boris Becker, seeded second, was eliminated in the third round when he withdrew from his match with Neville Godwin with a wrist injury.

Seeds

  Pete Sampras (quarterfinals)
  Boris Becker (third round, retired)
  Andre Agassi (first round)
  Goran Ivanišević (quarterfinals)
  Yevgeny Kafelnikov (first round)
  Michael Chang (first round)
  Thomas Muster (withdrew)
  Jim Courier (first round)
  Thomas Enqvist (second round)
  Michael Stich (fourth round)
  Wayne Ferreira (third round)
  Stefan Edberg (second round)
  Todd Martin (semifinals)
  Marc Rosset (third round)
  Arnaud Boetsch (first round)
  Cédric Pioline (fourth round)
  Richard Krajicek (champion)

Thomas Muster withdrew due to injury. His spot was replaced in the draw by the highest-ranked non-seeded player Richard Krajicek, who was made a seed without being numbered. Although Krajicek was shown as unseeded in the official souvenir programme during the championships, the committee ruled that he was seeded throughout and this is reflected in the final issue of the programme. He was indeed replaced by lucky loser Anders Järryd in the main draw.

Qualifying

Draw

Finals

Top half

Section 1

Section 2

Section 3

Section 4

Bottom half

Section 5

Section 6

Section 7

Section 8

References

External links

 1996 Wimbledon Championships – Men's draws and results at the International Tennis Federation

Men's Singles
Wimbledon Championship by year – Men's singles